Colopisthus canna is a species of crustacean isopods of the family Cirolanidae that lives in Cape Verde. The species was described in 2003 by W. Moore and R. C. Brusca, based on individuals collected on São Vicente. São Vicente is the only known place where it occurs.

References

Isopoda
Fauna of São Vicente, Cape Verde
Endemic fauna of Cape Verde
Crustaceans described in 2003